Cubanohydracarus is a genus of mites in the family Hungarohydracaridae. It is a monotypic genus containing only the species C. elegans. It is found in Cuba.

References

External links

 Cubanohydracarus at insectoid.info

Trombidiformes genera
Monotypic arachnid genera